is a Japanese science fiction manga series written and illustrated by Hiroya Oku. It was serialized in Kodansha's seinen manga magazine Evening from January 2014 to July 2017, with its chapters compiled in ten tankōbon volumes. The story follows two people, who via a mysterious event, are endowed with super abilities, but the way they choose to use these abilities is completely different.

An anime television series adaptation produced by MAPPA aired on Fuji TV's late night programming block Noitamina from October to December 2017. A live-action film adaptation premiered in Japan in April 2018.

Plot
Inuyashiki Ichiro is an older, friendless man with an uncaring family. One fateful evening in a nearly empty public park, he is struck by an explosion of extraterrestrial origin, and his body is replaced by an incredibly powerful, but still outwardly human, mechanical body. He quickly realizes the extent of his body's powers, and after saving a homeless man being beaten by a pack of teenagers, he decides to dedicate himself to doing good, using his powers to heal those with incurable diseases and fight crime.

However, a teenager who was with him at the time of the explosion, Shishigami Hiro, had the same fate as Ichiro, but unlike Inuyashiki, Shishigami becomes a psychopath who goes about using his newfound abilities to murder various people, from classmates that annoy him to innocent families, including young children, just for amusement. His acts of merciless cruelty bring him the attention of the police, who can do nothing to stop him. Hiro becomes the most wanted criminal in the country. The series follows these two different people who once shared the same bizarre experience, as their paths are destined to clash.

Characters

Played by: Noritake Kinashi
The head of the Inuyashiki family who looks older than his age, being 58 years old. He has no friends and is disrespected by his family, with the only thing he trusts being his dog, Hanako. He was on the verge of death, but after being struck by extraterrestrial beings, he was transformed into a cyborg. Not wanting to lose his humanity, he fights to save those in trouble.

Played by: Takeru Satoh
A teenager who was with Inuyashiki when the extraterrestrial beings struck them to death. He also became a cyborg, but he takes pleasure in killing people, which, according to him, keeps him human. The only people he cares about are his mother, his friend Naoyuki, and, later, Shion and her grandmother. His standard method of killing someone is making a finger gun and saying 'Bang!', which has the same effect as shooting someone with an actual gun. This will work on anyone who witnesses it, even if played on a television screen. He can also imitate a machine gun by shouting "da-da-da" while pretending to hold one, which will have the same effect.

Played by: Kanata Hongō
Hiro's childhood friend who initially shut himself in at home after being bullied at school. He is the first person to learn about Inuyashiki and Hiro's cyborg bodies. Wanting to stop his friend from killing, he teams up with Inuyashiki. He is a fan of Gantz, another manga of Hiroya Oku's.

Played by: Ayaka Miyoshi
Inuyashiki's teenage daughter and a classmate of both Hiro and Andō. She secretly wants to become a manga artist.

Played by: Fumi Nikaidō
A classmate of Hiro who has a crush on him. She sheltered Hiro at her home after he first escaped from the police, and became another woman that Hiro loved.

Media

Manga

Inuyashiki is written and illustrated by Hiroya Oku. The manga started publishing in the 4th issue of Kodansha's seinen magazine Evening, published on January 28, 2014. The manga finished in the 16th 2017 issue of Evening published on July 25, 2017. Kodansha compiled the 85 chapters of the series into ten tankōbon volumes published between May 23, 2014 and September 22, 2017.

Kodansha Comics, had published the manga in English in North America. Crunchyroll published the manga in a digital format.

Anime
An anime television series adaptation by MAPPA began airing on October 12, 2017, and a live-action film adaptation has been announced for 2018. The anime series' opening theme is "My Hero", performed by Japanese rock band Man with a Mission. The ending theme  is performed by the band Qaijff. Amazon had licensed the series and streamed it online on Amazon Prime Video in Japan and overseas. It was streamed on Anime Strike in the United States. Amazon discontinued Anime Strike on January 5, 2018, which in turn made Anime Strike titles, including Inuyashiki, free to stream for Prime members.

Live-action film

On December 21, 2017, a teaser trailer and website appeared for a live-action adaptation of Inuyashiki. The film, the first in a planned trilogy, was released on April 20, 2018, directed by Shinsuke Sato, who had previously directed the live-action Gantz, and stars Noritake Kinashi as Inuyashiki Ichihiro and Takeru Satoh as Shishigami Hiro.

Reception

Manga
Inuyashiki was one of the Manga division's Jury Selections at the 18th and 19th Japan Media Arts Festival in 2014 and 2015. The manga has won the French award "Daruma d'or manga" at the Japan Expo Awards 2016. It was picked as a nominee for Best Comic for the 44th Angoulême International Comics Festival in 2017. Inuyashiki was nominated for the Best Comic category at the 49th Seiun Awards in 2018. The series ranked 18th in the first Next Manga Award in the print manga category.

As of April 2018, the manga had over 3.1 million copies in circulation. Volume 2 reached the 18th place on the weekly Oricon manga charts and, as of November 2, 2014, has sold 76,886 copies; volume 3 reached the 15th place and, as of March 1, 2015, has sold 74,974 copies.

In February 2021, it was reported that the series, along with Death Note and Tokyo Ghoul, was banned from distribution on two unspecified websites in Russia.

Anime
At the 2nd Crunchyroll Anime Awards held in 2018, Inuyashiki was nominated for "Best CGI" and the character Hiro Shishigami was nominated for "Villain of the Year", but lost in both of them.

Notes

References

External links
  
 

2017 anime television series debuts
Anime Strike
Aniplex
Body horror anime and manga
Fuji TV original programming
Kodansha manga
MAPPA
Noitamina
Science fiction anime and manga
Seinen manga
Superheroes in anime and manga
Works banned in Russia